Anthony Henry Ashley-Cooper (5 May 1807 – 2 December 1858) was an English politician and cricketer with amateur status.

Early life 
Ashley was born at Wimborne St Giles in Dorset in 1807, a son of Cropley Ashley-Cooper, 6th Earl of Shaftesbury, and younger brother of Anthony Ashley-Cooper, 7th Earl of Shaftesbury, and of Anthony William Ashley.

Career 
He was a member of parliament for Dorchester from 1831 to 1847.

As a cricketer, he was associated with Marylebone Cricket Club (MCC) and made his first-class cricket debut in 1830.

Death 
He died in 1858 at Clewer in Berkshire.

References

1807 births
1858 deaths
English cricketers
English cricketers of 1826 to 1863
Marylebone Cricket Club cricketers
Younger sons of earls